Mel Rojas (born May 24, 1990) is a Dominican-American professional baseball outfielder for the Toros de Tijuana of the Mexican League. He has previously played in the KBO League for the KT Wiz and in Nippon Professional Baseball (NPB) for the Hanshin Tigers.

Early life
Rojas was born in Indianapolis in 1990 when his father, Mel Rojas, was playing for the Indianapolis Indians. A member of the Alou family, he was raised in the Dominican Republic. As a child, he played both baseball and basketball. He attended high school in Mt. Carmel, Illinois.

College
Rojas played junior college baseball at Wabash Valley College where, in his only season, he led the nation with 61 stolen bases in 64 attempts. He was named the 2010 Great Rivers Athletic Conference Freshman of the Year. He played two summers of collegiate summer baseball with the Amsterdam Mohawks of the New York Collegiate Baseball League.

Career

Pittsburgh Pirates
Rojas was drafted by the Pittsburgh Pirates in the third round of the 2010 Major League Baseball draft out of Wabash Valley College. He signed with the Pirates and made his professional debut that season with the State College Spikes.

In 2011, Rojas spent the season with the West Virginia Power. In 2012, Rojas spent the season with Bradenton Marauders. In 2013, Rojas spent the season with the Double-A Altoona Curve.

In 2014, Rojas started the season with Altoona and was promoted to the Triple-A Indianapolis Indians in July.

In 2015, The Pirates invited Rojas to spring training. Cut from the team in March, Rojas began the season at the Triple-A level. After a midseason demotion to the Curve, Rojas rejoined the Indians in September.

Atlanta Braves
On May 9, 2016, Rojas was traded to the Atlanta Braves for cash considerations. He was assigned to the Double-A Mississippi Braves, and promoted to the Triple-A Gwinnett Braves seven weeks later. Rojas finished his 2016 season batting .253 with 12 home runs and 46 RBIs.

KT Wiz 
On June 12, 2017, Rojas signed with the KT Wiz of the KBO League for $400,000. On November 14, 2017, he re-signed with KT Wiz for $1,000,000.

In 2018 he broke the KT Wiz franchise record for home runs with 43.

In 2020, he also signed a $1.5 million contract, staying at KT Wiz. Rojas nearly won the batting Triple Crown, leading the league in home runs (47) and RBIs (135), but coming in third place for batting average (.349). He was later voted the 2020 KBO League MVP.

Hanshin Tigers
On December 8, 2020, Rojas signed a two-year deal with the Hanshin Tigers of Nippon Professional Baseball. He played in 60 games for Hanshin in 2021, hitting .217/.282/.381 with 8 home runs and 21 RBI. In 2022, Rojas appeared in 89 contests for the Tigers, slashing .224/.322/.410 with 9 home runs and 27 RBI. He became a free agent following the 2022 season.

Toros de Tijuana
On March 6, 2023, Rojas signed with the Toros de Tijuana of the Mexican League.

Personal life
Rojas is the son of former Major League Baseball player, Mel Rojas.

References

External links

 Career statistics - NPB.jp

1990 births
Living people
Alou family
Altoona Curve players
American expatriate baseball players in South Korea
American sportspeople of Dominican Republic descent
Bradenton Marauders players
Estrellas Orientales players
Gigantes de Carolina players
Gwinnett Braves players
Indianapolis Indians players
KBO League Most Valuable Player Award winners
KBO League outfielders
KT Wiz players
Mississippi Braves players
State College Spikes players
Tigres del Licey players
Wabash Valley Warriors baseball players
West Virginia Power players
World Baseball Classic players of the Dominican Republic
2017 World Baseball Classic players
Hanshin Tigers players